Immerse Learning (formerly called Languagelab.com) is an English school based in an Online Virtual World. It is the first school that teaches exclusively online in a virtual environment; students and teachers use avatars to navigate the environment and take part in lessons. Lessons are also completely contextual, which is in direct contradiction to the traditional classroom system.

In 2016, Immerse moved their focus away from desktop training to developing a VR platform aimed at large enterprises that need to scale their VR training across multiple locations and users.

History
Immerse Learning was founded in 2005 as Languagelab.com in London by David Kaskel and Shiv Rajendran. Having been amazed at how quickly foreign players had picked up language skills in MMORPGs,  Kaskel began to look into how learning took place in video games. To date Languagelab.com has 80 employees based in 14 different countries and caters to about 1000 students (2011).

Languagelab.com teaches English to students from more than seventy countries.

In 2011 Languagelab.com announced a partnership with Pearson Education to produce a virtual world product for Business English. The product is called Market Leader Live and contains content from the Financial Times.

In February 2014, Languagelab.com relaunched as Immerse Learning with a proprietary immersive learning platform designed specifically for corporate and higher education programmes.

In 2016 Immerse Learning changed its name to Immerse and their web address is now Immerse.io. Immerse provide businesses with ready-made VR scenarios or with software and tools to create their own. Current clients include Shell, DHL, GE Healthcare and QinetiQ.

Methodology
Languagelab.com's current methods based on an internal research and development program, led by Rajendran, spanning from 2005 to 2008 involving testing a range of models of teaching with students from more than 50 countries. Based on immersive learning, the idea that all lessons should be taught contextually and uses virtual environments to recreate the scenarios where interactions would take place in the real world. Experts believe that virtual worlds and immersive learning are far more effective for studying higher order cognitive lessons "Generative Learning" than the traditional classroom based system, which is taught in abstraction. Modern research suggests this method of learning is more effective than traditional methodology in which new words are introduced gradually through abstraction.  This method is similar to Situated cognition.

All teaching is done in real time by real teachers. Languagelab employ a mix of teachers and actors who appear as avatars to help guide learners through a range of simulated "real life" situations. Students can develop communication skills by working as a team on such tasks as tackling an oil rig explosion and the resulting environmental catastrophes or more conventional courses. Languagelab.com has developed adaptive learning algorithms and on-demand class creation practices that provide each student a tailored program to meet their needs.

English City
English City is a virtual city created on Second Life where all the language classes take place. It seeks to mimic the learning process that gamers undergo in video games. The premise is that in video games players learn how to play through participation, and are taught new skills in situ. Players also receive instant feedback from their actions throughout the game; the penalty for failure is minimal as the player gets the chance to immediately try the mission again. These qualities allow game players to learn far quicker than if they were given a class on the subject.

English City contains an airport, cafes, hotels, museums and galleries, and even clubs and bars, numerous settings for students to practice English in both classes and in their own time. The city is also populated by English speaking actors, who are there for the students to practice their English.

"Students who visit English City (pictured), a language-teaching program, can chat to passers-by as they wander through the streets, meet their tutors’ avatars in virtual cafés and order snacks from Pebbles, an aspiring actress played by a teacher"

Virtual Reality
Immerse has now moved away from Second Life, concentrating on creating their own virtual reality simulations for businesses to use for training and as a sales tool. Their Unity based Software Development Kit is currently undergoing a Beta Trial with several companies and educational institutions. When finalised and released the SDK will allow for many more companies to create their own content for virtual reality without relying on a design or development agency.

References

External links
Immerse Learning's Website
Archive of LanguageLab's Website

Persistent worlds
English-language education
Virtual reality organizations
British educational websites
2005 establishments in England
Educational institutions established in 2005
Social networking language-learning websites